Frances Stead Sellers is a senior writer at The Washington Post and frequent moderator for the newsroom’s live platform, Washington Post Live.

Life and career
Sellers’ career as a reporter, editor and moderator has ranged from politics to the arts and sciences. In recent years, she has written extensively about the coronavirus pandemic and the country’s political polarization and cultural upheaval.

As a national political reporter, Sellers covered the 2016 presidential campaign, writing about the leading candidates and key figures in the Trump administration. She was a member of the team that wrote the 2016 best seller Trump Revealed: The Definitive Biography of the 45th President. She is a regular host of Washington Post Live and has interviewed key figures in the contemporary political and cultural conversations.

Sellers has been a senior editor in charge of several sections of The Washington Post, including Health and Science and the signature daily section, Style, which focuses on political profiles, personalities, arts and ideas.

As deputy national editor, Sellers ran the newsroom's health, science and environmental coverage, during the H1N1 pandemic, the battle over health reform, the Deepwater Horizon oil spill and the 2011 Japanese tsunami and Fukushima Daiichi nuclear disaster. Her previous jobs at the Post include deputy editor of Outlook, the Sunday commentary section.

Sellers is often called upon to explain U.S. current events to British audiences on BBC Radio 4's current affairs programming. She has appeared as a commentator on BBC World News and MSNBC's Morning Joe and interviewed prominent figures in the arts, sciences and politics. She is a moderator for idea festivals and academic conferences.

Sellers joined The Post from Civilization, the bi-monthly magazine of the Library of Congress. She was a member of the launch team, and led the magazine to a National Magazine Award for General Excellence in its first year of publication. Sellers started her career at Dædalus, the Journal of the American Academy of Arts and Sciences.

Sellers was born in Britain, graduated from Oxford University and came to the United States as a British Thouron scholar to study linguistics at the University of Pennsylvania. Among many other areas of interest, she is known for writing about language, citizenship and identity. Sellers is married to the law professor Mortimer Sellers.

Awards
 Visiting Fellow, Reuters Institute for the Study of Journalism, 2017 
 Visiting Fellow, Lady Margaret Hall, Oxford, 2017
 Press Fellow, UN Foundation, 2015
 Press Fellow, Wolfson College, Cambridge - 2006 
 Alicia Patterson Foundation Fellow - 2003 
 British Thouron Scholarship

References

External links
Frances Stead Sellers (author page) Biography and recent stories, The Washington Post
 
 

Living people
Year of birth missing (living people)
The Washington Post people
Journalists from Washington, D.C.
Alumni of Lady Margaret Hall, Oxford
American women journalists
21st-century American women